Michael Varrati is an American filmmaker, screenwriter, columnist, and actor known primarily for his work within the horror genre and the world of TV movies.  Outside of his film work, Varrati has used his platform to discuss pop culture and the horror genre as it relates to the LGBTQ experience, frequently writing about and arranging curated speaking events on the topic at such venues as San Diego Comic-Con, as well as serving as the host and curator of the queer horror discussion series Dead for Filth.

Some of Varrati's notable works include Tales of Poe, A Christmas in Vermont, The Wrong Stepmother, the screenlife horror Unusual Attachment, episodes of the popular audio series Darkest Night and Deadly Manners, and serving as a writer/director of the cult series The Boulet Brothers' Dragula.

In 2014, Agents of Geek named Varrati one of the "9 Must-Follow Geeks on Twitter."

Early career, column work, and Peaches Christ
Born in New Mexico,  Varrati took an avid interest in writing fairly early on in his life. Citing exposure to the works of Stephen King and the films shown on USA Up All Night as early influences, Varrati has stated he always knew some aspect of his work would be geared toward the horror genre.

While attending Kent State University in Ohio, Varrati studied acting for the camera under character actor Rohn Thomas (who himself had appeared in films from such horror luminaries as George Romero and John Landis). Although primarily identifying as a writer, Varrati would cite this experience later a crucial factor in his approach to taking acting roles in the future.

Shortly after his time at Kent, Varrati began writing for the underground horror film magazine Ultra Violent, wherein he interviewed cult and international filmmakers. Varrati has said his work with Ultra Violent began to lay the foundations for his own work in film, as he began making contacts during this era.

In 2008, while working on a now defunct book project, Varrati connected with San Francisco-based drag performer Peaches Christ (stage name for Joshua Grannell), hoping to interview her for the book. Instead, the two became friends, and when Christ took her directorial debut movie All About Evil on the road, she invited Varrati along to help document the experience.  Writing a travelogue from the road for Peaches’ site, Varrati eventually began doing a regular column for the drag icon's audience.  Since this period, Varrati and Christ have remained close and still occasionally collaborate.  In 2016, the two reunited to co-produce an event for the 25th Anniversary of Vegas in Space for the Frameline Film Festival.

Around this same time as his initial work with Peaches, Varrati began to do column work for various other publications, which lead to regular contributions over the years to a number of outlets, including The Huffington Post, VideoInk, Tubefilter, Vice, and more.

Tales of Poe
Prior to his taking to the road with Peaches Christ, Varrati had begun dipping his foot into the world of acting, appearing in several independent horror features. While acting on one such film, Razor Days, Varrati reconnected with the film's director of photography, Bart Mastronardi, whom he had previously met at a horror convention several years previous. The duo began discussing Mastronardi's plan to create an anthology of modern adaptations of Edgar Allan Poe stories.  Soon thereafter, Varrati and Mastronardi agreed to collaborate on one of the film's segments.

Shot over the course of several years, Tales of Poe featured three adaptations of Poe stories: The Tell-Tale Heart (written & directed by Mastronardi), The Cask of Amontillado (written & directed by Alan Rowe Kelly), and Dreams, which was written by Varrati and directed by Mastronardi.

The Dreams segment, written by Varrati as a silent, surrealistic piece, was notable in its inclusion of horror movie scream queens of yesteryear, casting the likes of Adrienne King (of the original Friday the 13th), Amy Steel (of Friday the 13th Part 2 and April Fool’s Day), and Caroline Williams (of Texas Chainsaw Massacre 2 and Contracted). The segment was hailed by Decay magazine as "an excellent exhibition of experimental Horror filmmaking." Varrati has said that the segment allowed him "give life to an existential crisis" on film and cites filmmakers Derek Jarman and Jean Cocteau as being influential on the piece's dreamlike nature.

Tales of Poe premiered on August 20, 2014  at the Egyptian Theatre in Hollywood, and has played numerous theatrical screenings in the years following, garnering a number of awards.

The Sins of Dracula and Flesh for the Inferno
While he was in the midst of making Tales of Poe, Varrati connected with prolific New England-based filmmaker Richard Griffin. Initially collaborating with Griffin on a short about gay aliens titled Crash Site, the duo soon began work on a feature film: The Sins of Dracula.

Written during the same period as Varrati wrote Tales of Poe, The Sins of Dracula was a departure from Poe’s serious tone, instead focusing on elements of horror comedy. Telling the story of a community theater troupe who must stop the newly risen Count Dracula, the film served as a satiric homage to the Christian scare films of the early 80s. Released on October 26th, 2014, The Sins of Dracula was called a "modern classic" by Horror Society.

Griffin and Varrati would collaborate again a year later on Flesh for the Inferno, an Italian horror homage about demon nuns who attack a church youth group.  Praised as a "dark, gory horror film with edge," Flesh for the Inferno was named "Best Independent Horror Film of 2015" by Horror Society.

Griffin and Varrati have also collaborated on several short films together, including a Halloween short Hearty Treats and a faux-trailer They Stole the Pope’s Blood. Additionally, Varrati contributed writing to Griffin's horror comedy Seven Dorms of Death.

Christmas movies & TV thrillers
A departure from the world of horror, in 2015 Varrati branched out into the world of TV movies, co-writing the script for A Christmas Reunion, a holiday film starring Denise Richards and Patrick Muldoon that debuted on the Ion Network.

In 2016, Varrati wrote another holiday film, A Christmas in Vermont, starring Chevy Chase, Morgan Fairchild, and Howard Hesseman that also appeared on Ion.  That same year, Varrati would also create the original story for Broadcasting Christmas, which was adapted by playwright Topher Payne for the Hallmark Channel and starred Melissa Joan Hart and Dean Cain. In 2020, Varrati returned to the genre, writing the original script for the Canadian-produced Christmas with a Crown and co-writing the Mar Vista Entertainment produced A Christmas Mission.

In an interview with The Wall Street Journal, Varrati spoke about the fact that he was able to write both horror and holiday fare, saying that he felt both kinds of story were important, as they catered to different needs of the audience.

Beyond the world of holiday films, Varrati has also written a number of thrillers and genre adjacent pieces for TV networks, including the Lifetime original movie The Wrong Stepmother, which was produced by Vivica A. Fox and was named by Yahoo! News as one of the "18 Best Lifetime Movies of All Time." Other works by Varrati in this space include the 2019 Lifetime thriller The Twisted Nanny (alternatively titled in some markets as The Nightmare House), and the disaster movie End of the World. In 2021, Varrati also provided the original story for the Vivica Fox-starring horror movie Aquarium of the Dead, which was adapted to screen by writer Marc Gottleib.

Directorial work and June Gloom Productions

While working as a producer and writer on the award-winning queer TV series I’m Fine, Varrati and series creator Brandon Kirby struck up a creative partnership that led to the foundation of June Gloom Productions. A production label “devoted to the production, curation, and creation of queer horror and queer social commentary cinema,” June Gloom was created as a means for Kirby and Varrati to curate projects that spoke to their own storytelling interests, as well as help other queer-identifying filmmakers do the same.

Through June Gloom, Varrati has written and directed a handful of short form film projects, including The Office is Mine, queer slasher A Halloween Trick, and the isolation horror film What’s Left Inside, which made its North American Premiere at Outfest in 2021.

Fairly early into the Covid-19 pandemic, Varrati was one of the first filmmakers to release a “quarantine horror” project. The film in question, Unusual Attachment, was released in April 2020, and was shot entirely remotely as a screenlife/found footage narrative about a man who runs into unspeakable horrors while using online dating sites.

Later in the pandemic, Brandon Kirby and Michael Varrati would use this remote shooting technique to co-create a queer drama miniseries titled So Far, So Close for the Dekkoo streaming platform.

Varrati has also done a fair amount of directing work outside of June Gloom, including writing and directing a segment of the international holiday horror anthology film Deathcember and serving as a writer and director on the cult horror series The Boulet Brothers' Dragula.

The LGBTQ+ Horror Panel
Since 2013, Varrati has served as the host and curator of the "Queer Fear" panel at San Diego Comic Con. The panel has garnered attention over the years for its in-depth discussion of LGBTQ+ issues and its high-profile guests (which have included Bryan Fuller, Jeffrey Reddick, Guinevere Turner, and more). Throughout the year, Varrati will also host variants on the panel and has written numerous pieces pertaining to its topic.

In 2021, Varrati hosted a virtual version of the Queer Horror panel due to Comic-Con's in-person events being postponed by the ongoing Covid pandemic.

Dead for Filth and Midnight Mass
Motivated by the annual discussions being had at the LGBTQ+ Horror Panel at Comic-Con, Varrati was inspired to create a weekly conversation series that would explore those topics year-round. As a result, he created Dead for Filth, a streaming audio series that debuted in August 2017. Originally produced by Revry and later through his own June Gloom Productions, Dead for Filth was a weekly, in-depth interview podcast that saw Varrati sit for a long form conversation with a creator, performer, or other notable person in the genre space and discuss the intersection of queer identity and horror. Notable guests on Dead for Filth included Final Destination creator Jeffrey Reddick, Hollywood legend Veronica Cartwright, and Ash vs Evil Dead’s Ray Santiago. Dead for Filth ran for 100 episodes, as well as several specials, before Varrati wrapped the series up. During its run, Dead for Filth was named by The Advocate as one of "12 LGBTQ Podcasts You Should Be Listening To" and by NBC as an LGBTQ Podcast "To Know."

In 2021, Varrati returned to the podcast space to co-host a new series, Midnight Mass, with friend and frequent collaborator Peaches Christ. Inspired and named for Peaches Christ's long-running cult movie series in San Francisco, Midnight Mass sees Varrati and Christ do weekly explorations into the nature and devoted fanbase of cult cinema.

Other work
Varrati has twice collaborated with filmmaker JT Seaton on short film projects that have played at various festivals. The first of which was a comedic time travel short titled Then and Again that starred Sleepaway Camp’s Jonathan Tiersten, and the second was a dark fairy tale titled In Darkest Slumber.

Varrati reunited with his Tales of Poe collaborators Bart Mastronardi and Alan Rowe Kelly in 2015 to work with filmmaker Billy Clift on a short film biopic about the life of Hollywood actor Montgomery Clift, titled Monty. With an original script by Varrati, the film was shot by Mastronardi, directed by Clift, and premiered at the Cinema Diverse Film Festival in Palm Springs in 2016.

In late 2016, Nightmarish Conjurings named Mystery Phone, a short written by Varrati and directed by Ama Lea, as one of the best horror shorts of the year. Varrati and Ama Lea would later work together again on the lesbian vampire short From Hell, She Rises, which was also directed by Lea.

Also in 2016, Varrati wrote a number of pop culture oriented videos for Frederator Studios’ (creators of Adventure Time) YouTube channel.

In 2017, Varrati joined the writing team of the narrative horror podcast Darkest Night starring Lee Pace, Denis O’Hare, and RuPaul. Shortly thereafter, he also became one of the writers for the murder mystery audio series Deadly Manners, starring Kristen Bell, Anna Chlumsky, and LeVar Burton.

In October 2018, Varrati wrote and served as the on-camera host of Skybound's History of Fright, a multi-part digital series about the history of horror icons and subgenres. The series ran on Skybound's GammaRay Channel.

In October 2020, Varrati wrote and directed the Halloween Special episode of the narrative audio series It Listens from the Radio.

As an actor, Varrati has appeared in numerous independent horror films and has worked with such notable filmmakers as Lloyd Kaufman, Mike Mendez, and Stuart Gordon.

Current and upcoming work

Peaches Christ has revealed in several interviews that she and Varrati are currently co-writing a feature film script together, which will serve as a follow-up to her directorial debut.

References

External links

American filmmakers
American columnists
American male actors
American screenwriters
Living people
Year of birth missing (living people)